Xiong may refer to:

Name
 Xiong (surname) (熊), a Chinese surname

Location
 Xiong County, in Hebei, China

Language
 The pinyin romanization of several Chinese characters, including 兄 (elder brother), 胸 (chest), 雄 (heroic) and 熊 (bear)
 The Xong language and the Miao people who speak it

Group
 Xong, or Limbu people
 A subdivision of the Mongol armies: see Huns